John Densham (2 February 1880 – 8 January 1975) was a British hurdler. He competed in the men's 400 metres hurdles at the 1908 Summer Olympics.

References

1880 births
1975 deaths
Athletes (track and field) at the 1908 Summer Olympics
British male hurdlers
Olympic athletes of Great Britain
Place of birth missing